Istgah-e Kuh Pank (also Romanized as Īstgāh-e Kūh Pank; also known as Īstgāh-e Kūh Pang, Īstgāh-e Kūpang, Īstgāh-e Kūpeng, Īstgāh-e Rāh Āhan-e Kūh Pang, Kūh Pang, and Kūh Penal) is a village and railway station in Taraznahid Rural District, in the Central District of Saveh County, Markazi Province, Iran. At the 2006 census, its population was 8, in 7 families.

References 

Populated places in Saveh County
Railway stations in Iran